The Siegel Group, Inc. is an American diversified company based in Paradise, Nevada and Studio City, California.  It owns and operates hotels, hotel casinos, short-stay apartments,  office buildings, shopping centers, and land for development.

History
The Siegel Group was founded in 2001 by Steve Siegel, who serves as chief executive officer and president of the company. It maintains corporate offices in Paradise, Nevada, and Sherman Oaks, California. It has 1000 employees and has been listed as one of Inc. Magazines 500 fastest-growing private businesses. The company purchases existing hotel and apartment complexes, then converts them into low-cost living facilities.

The Siegel Group also owned the Gold Spike Hotel and Casino in downtown Las Vegas from February 2008 until selling it in April 2013 to Tony Hsieh's Downtown Project.

By 2009, the Siegel Suites chain operated apartment complexes in Las Vegas and Mesquite, Nevada, totaling 3,000 units. Siegel had also purchased the Mount Charleston Hotel and renamed it as Resort on Mount Charleston.

In 2009, Siegel Group purchased the closed St. Tropez, a 150-room hotel in Las Vegas across from the Hard Rock Hotel. The company renovated and reopened it in 2010, as a boutique hotel called Rumor. Siegel eventually sold Rumor in 2017, to a group of Hong Kong buyers who renamed it Serene Vegas.

Atrium Suites, a hotel located next to the Hard Rock, was planned to reopen in 2009, after renovations. However, the project encountered financial problems and never reopened. The Siegel Group purchased it in 2011, and planned to renovate it and reopen it in 2013, under a new name. At six stories, Atrium Suites was the largest building ever owned by Siegel Group. It was a significant part of the Siegel Group's portfolio, although it did not open as scheduled, as the company had not decided on how to use the building. Siegel Group had also been busy renovating other properties. Siegel eventually put the hotel up for sale in 2016, then decided to convert it into an apartment and extended-stay facility. In 2019, Siegel announced that he would tear down the closed Atrium Suites building and construct a Siegel Suites in its place. It would be the second Siegel Suites to be built from the ground up. An earlier Siegel Suites began construction in Las Vegas in 2017.

In June 2015, The Siegel Group acquired a property in Arizona from Legacy Suites for $8.3 million. In May 2019, the group acquired two buildings in Las Vegas for $8.35 million and plans to turn them into a hub for eateries.

As of 2019, Judith Siegel is executive vice president and Michael Crandall is senior vice president of the company.

Growth
The Siegel Group has had rapid expansion in the past.  In 2004, it had an annual revenue of $8.5 million and $111 million by 2007.

Controversies 
A United States House of Representatives subcommittee investigating evictions during the Coronavirus pandemic found The Siegel Group had applied "uniquely egregious", deceptive and aggressive tactics to evict tenants. An email included in the report from Senior Vice President of Operations Mike Tisdale advised managers in the San Antonio area to threaten to have tenants cars towed, to call animal control to take their pets or child protective services to take their children, to arrange night and day door knocking, to use scheduled maintenance checks to remove air conditioning units, and to interfere with household electronics using universal remotes.

Management 

 Stephen Siegel - Chief Executive Officer & President
 Judith Siegel - Executive Vice President
 Michael Crandall - Senior Vice President
 Sean Thueson, Esq. - General Counsel
 Mike Tisdale - Senior VPO
 Ross Siegel - Chief Information Officer
 Chigozie Amadi - Chief Financial Officer
 Mark Higler - VP for Admin & Finance
 Michael Kurcz - VP Renovations & Facilities

References

External links
 Official site

Financial services companies established in 2001
Real estate companies established in 2001
Gambling companies of the United States
Hospitality companies of the United States
Companies based in Paradise, Nevada
Gambling companies established in 2001
American companies established in 2001
Investment companies of the United States
Real estate companies of the United States